Trupanea daphne is a species of tephritid or fruit flies in the genus Trupanea of the family Tephritidae.

Distribution
Uruguay, Argentina.

References

Tephritinae
Insects described in 1830
Diptera of South America